Darian Faisury Jiménez Sánchez (born 6 March 2000) is a Colombian Paralympic athlete. She made her maiden Paralympic appearance representing Colombia at the 2020 Summer Paralympics.

Career 
She claimed silver medal in the women's 100m T38 event at the 2020 Summer Paralympics.

References 

2000 births
Living people
Colombian female sprinters
Athletes (track and field) at the 2020 Summer Paralympics
Cerebral Palsy category Paralympic competitors
Paralympic athletes of Colombia
Paralympic silver medalists for Colombia
Medalists at the 2020 Summer Paralympics
Paralympic medalists in athletics (track and field)
Sportspeople from Cauca Department
21st-century Colombian women